Yuri Viktorovich Ushakov (born 13 March 1947) is a Russian and former Soviet diplomat who served as the Ambassador of Russia to the United States from 1998 until 2008. Since 2012, he has been an advisor to the President of Russia on foreign policy issues.

Ushakov is a graduate of Moscow State Institute of International Relations (MGIMO) and was the Russian Ambassador to the Organization for Security and Co-operation in Europe (OSCE) from 1996 to 1998.

He was appointed Ambassador of the Russian Federation to the United States in December 1998, until president Dmitry Medvedev replaced him with Sergey Kislyak on 31 May 2008. From June 2008 to May 2012 Ushakov was Deputy Chief of the Government Staff of the Russian Federation. Since May 2012 he has been Aide to the President of the Russian Federation responsible for international affairs in the Presidential Administration.

He commented on the Beslan school massacre in North Ossetia-Alania, Russia:

References

1947 births
Living people
1st class Active State Councillors of the Russian Federation
Ambassador Extraordinary and Plenipotentiary (Russian Federation)
Diplomats from Moscow
Ambassadors of Russia to the United States
Moscow State Institute of International Relations alumni
Permanent Representatives of Russia to the Organization for Security and Co-operation in Europe